AL-37350A (4,5-DHP-AMT) is a tryptamine derivative which acts as a potent and selective agonist for the serotonin receptor 5-HT2A, with a Ki of 2.0 nM, and moderate selectivity over the related 5-HT2B and 5-HT2C receptors. It has been shown to have ocular hypotensive activity in animal models, suggesting it may be useful for the treatment of glaucoma.

See also
 AL-38022A
 CP-132,484
 4,5-DHP-DMT

References 

Dihydropyrans
Serotonin receptor agonists
Tryptamines